Ferenc Miklós (August 7, 1909 – October 2002) was a Hungarian field hockey player who competed in the 1936 Summer Olympics.

In 1936 he was a member of the Hungarian team which was eliminated in the group stage of the Olympic tournament. He played all three matches as halfback.

External links
 
Ferenc Miklós's profile at Sports Reference.com
Mention of Ferenc Miklós' death 

1909 births
2002 deaths
Hungarian male field hockey players
Olympic field hockey players of Hungary
Field hockey players at the 1936 Summer Olympics